Cecere is a surname. Notable people with the surname include:

Alyssa Cecere (born 1987), Canadian ice hockey player
Antonio Cecere (born 1978), Italian writer
Carlo Cecere (1706–1761), Italian composer
Fulvio Cecere (born 1960), Canadian actor and filmmaker
Gaetano Cecere (1894–1985), American sculptor
Jennifer Cecere (born 1950), American artist
Mike Cecere (born 1968), British footballer
Vincenzo Cecere (1897–1955), Italian painter